Campiglossa iriomotensis is a species of tephritid or fruit flies in the genus Campiglossa of the family Tephritidae.

Distribution
The species is found in Japan.

References

Tephritinae
Insects described in 1968
Diptera of Asia